Popcorn is an unincorporated community in Perry Township, Lawrence County, Indiana.

History
Popcorn took its name from Popcorn Creek. A local legend states a visitor from out of town compared the size of local farmers' corn to "popcorn" compared to their own.

A post office called Popcorn was established in 1891, and remained in operation until it was discontinued in 1905.

The town is also known for a brand of kettle corn popcorn that takes the name of the town, but the company is not headquartered in the town.

Geography

Notes

Unincorporated communities in Lawrence County, Indiana
Unincorporated communities in Indiana